Sir Edward Brian Pepperall (born 27 December 1966) is British High Court judge. 

Pepperall was born in Bristol, England and educated at Queen Elizabeth's Hospital in Bristol. His grandfather was former Conservative MP Harold Gurden. He completed an LLB at the University of Birmingham in 1988 and attended the Inns of Court School of Law thereafter.

He was called to the bar at Lincoln's Inn in 1989 and practised commercial and employment law, initially from 2 Fountain Court Chambers in Birmingham and then St Philips Chambers located in Birmingham and London, where he was deputy head of chambers from 2014 to 2017. He served as a recorder from 2009 to 2018 and took silk in 2013. He was appointed a deputy High Court judge in 2016. In addition to practice, he contributed to the White Book from 2015. Since 2017, he has been a judge on the Falkland Islands and Other Territories Court of Appeal. 

On 1 October 2018, Pepperall was appointed a judge of the High Court and assigned to the Queen's Bench Division. He took the customary knighthood in the same year. He sits on the Technology and Construction Court. Since 2020, he has been Presiding Judge of the Midland Circuit.

In 2003, he married Sarah Fardell, with whom he has a son and two daughters.

References 

Living people
1966 births
21st-century English judges
Knights Bachelor
Alumni of the University of Birmingham
Members of Lincoln's Inn
Queen's Bench Division judges
English King's Counsel
21st-century King's Counsel